Desert Flower: The Extraordinary Journey of a Desert Nomad is an autobiographical book written by Waris Dirie and Cathleen Miller, published in 1998 about the life of Somali model, Waris Dirie.

Summary
Despite suffering female genital mutilation (FGM) at the age of five, and its life-long consequences, Waris Dirie escaped from her native Galkayo, Somalia, fleeing to Mogadishu to escape an arranged marriage. Moving with relatives to London, she worked for a while at a McDonald's and was discovered by chance by fashion photographer Terence Donovan. She continued via modelling in film and fashion to a stage where she was considered a supermodel. It was at this point that, with Miller, she wrote this autobiography. Shortly afterwards she became a UN ambassador for the abolition of FGM.

Publication
Desert Flower, William Morrow Pub, 1998 (1st edition),

Film adaptation
In 2009, the book was adapted into a film of the same name. Produced by Peter Herrmann and Benjamin Herrmann, the Ethiopian supermodel Liya Kebede plays Waris in the title role.

References

Related links
 Our goals: Waris Dirie Manifesto, desertflowerfoundation.org

In-line references

1998 non-fiction books
American biographies
Works about female genital mutilation